In Alevism, a Pir meaning Elder is one of the 12 ranks of Imam in Alevism. The highest rank of Dede, the Murshid is selected from among the Pirs.

See also 
 Pir

Turkish culture
Alevism
Islam in Turkey
Shia Islam in Turkey